John Matthew Weston (19 October 1900 – 1984) was an English professional footballer. He played as a winger, initially for Burnley, from 1928–1932, then for Northampton Town, and lastly for Shelbourne Football Club.

References

Sportspeople from Dudley
English footballers
Association football wingers
Burnley F.C. players
Northampton Town F.C. players
Shelbourne F.C. players
English Football League players
1900 births
1984 deaths